C&I Leasing Group PLC  is a Nigerian public limited maritime company. Formed in 1990 as a private company, it was converted into a public company listed at the Nigerian stock exchange in 1997.

The service conglomerate is managed along three business lines

C & I Fleet Management which is managed along with the Hertz car rental franchise in Nigeria is adequately supported by C & I leasing's own service centre and their Citracks Telematics solutions making the Fleet Management business a one-stop brand for fleet management services.

The Ghanaian subsidiary of the group; Leasafric Ghana PLC is the largest provider of fleet management services in Ghana.

The C & I outsourcing unit specializes in human resource outsourcing, recruitment services, payroll services and business process outsourcing for blue chip organisations along with the SDS training centre which focuses on human capacity development for existing outsourcing clients and others.

The C & I Marine Unit is structured to provide a range of both onshore and offshore services to take advantage of the opportunities in the Nigerian Local Content laws. It charters and operates ships on a contractual basis from short to long term. It primarily charters offshore vessels and security patrol ships, operating in the Gulf of Guinea and Bonny river delta. As per its website, the company employs about 4,500 people in six offices located in Port Harcourt, Benin, Enugu, Lagos, Abuja and Ghana. It also operates in Ghana through its subsidiary Leasafric Ghana Limited and in the United Arab Emirates through its subsidiary Epic International FZE.

References 

Companies listed on the Nigerian Stock Exchange
Transport companies established in 1990
Companies based in Lagos
Service companies of Nigeria
Nigerian companies established in 1990